Tomás Ruiz (born 17 September 1967) is a Spanish boxer. He competed in the men's light welterweight event at the 1988 Summer Olympics.

References

1967 births
Living people
Spanish male boxers
Olympic boxers of Spain
Boxers at the 1988 Summer Olympics
Place of birth missing (living people)
Light-welterweight boxers